The Silver Fish Award is the highest adult award in Girlguiding. It is awarded for outstanding service to Girlguiding combined with service to world Guiding. The award has changed greatly since it first appeared in 1911, initially being awarded to girls on completion of a number of badges, then via numerous stages to the highest award in the Guiding movement worldwide, and then on to its position as a Girlguiding award.

Award criteria
The Silver Fish is not earned, but given to those who are nominated and are considered worthy of the award. Recipients must be members of Girlguiding, have done outstanding service to Guiding in more than one capacity and made a contribution to world Guiding. Ideally candidates should be at least 18 months from retirement and have held an appointment within 6 months of the nomination.

History
The award of Silver Fish existed from the beginning of the Guiding movement. The choice of the silver fish was as a result of Lord Baden-Powell visiting Japan, where he learnt that when a son was born, parents would hang a small silver fish on their door, signifying the boy would be able to successfully 'swim upstream' through life's challenges. If a daughter was born, a tiny doll was used. This indicated a girl's sole aim was to raise a family. Lord Baden-Powell decided to make a Guide's highest honour a silver fish, to show that girls are just as capable of battling against the odds as boys.

Award for Girl Guides
The award is mentioned in the November 1909 edition of the Boy Scout Headquarters Gazette in "The Scheme for 'Girl Guides'". Here a girl must pass seventeen specified efficiency badges. However, in Pamphlet A: Baden-Powell Girl Guides, a Suggestion for Character Training for Girls, also published in 1909, twenty efficiency badges were needed to obtain the Silver Fish. This was later reduced to fifteen and, additionally, good all round work was required.

Award for Girl Scouts of USA
Around the time of the foundation of the Girl Scouts of the USA in 1912, their handbook listed the Silver Fish as the highest honour in Girl Scouting. However, before anyone could earn it, the Golden Eaglet was introduced.

Five American women were awarded the Silver Fish:
 Juliette Gordon Low, founder of Girl Scouts USA
 Anne Hyde Choate, Juliette's goddaughter and the second president of Girl Scouts USA
 Helen Storrow, donor of Our Chalet  
 Jane Deeter Rippin, National Director of GSUSA
 Julia Cobb Crowell, Chair of the Committee

Award for adults
In October 1917, the award changed to being given for outstanding service to the movement. At this time, the design also changed from a whiting with its tail in its mouth worn on a silver chain, to a swimming fish worn on a dark and light blue striped ribbon. Olave Baden-Powell was presented with a gold Silver Fish in 1918, then the only one of its kind. In 1995, her daughter Betty Clay was presented with a gold Silver Fish in the form of a brooch. It continues to be awarded within UK GirlGuiding to this day.

Recipients

1911–1919

1920–1929

1930–1939

1940–1949

1950–1959

1960–1969

1970–1979

1980–1989

1990–1999

2000 onwards

Date of award unknown

See also
 Thanks Badge Girl Scouts of USA highest adult honour
 Silver Wolf Award for distinguished service to Scouting in the UK

References

Girl Guiding and Girl Scouting
Scout and Guide awards